Outram Park MRT station is an underground Mass Rapid Transit (MRT) interchange station on the East West, North East and Thomson-East Coast lines located on the boundary of Bukit Merah and Outram planning areas, Singapore, near the junction of Outram Road, Eu Tong Sen Street and New Bridge Road. It is the nearest MRT station to the Singapore General Hospital, Police Cantonment Complex, Outram Community Hospital and the Health Promotion Board.

Following the opening of the Thomson–East Coast Line on 13 November 2022, Outram Park station became a triple-line interchange, joining Marina Bay and Dhoby Ghaut stations.

History

East West line

Outram Park station was included in the early plans of the MRT network in May 1982. It was to be constructed as part of the Phase I MRT segment from the Novena to this station; this segment was targeted to be completed by December 1987. This segment was given priority as it passes through areas having a higher demand for public transport, such as the densely populated housing estates of Toa Payoh and Ang Mo Kio and the Central Area. The line was aimed to relieve the traffic congestion on the Thomson–Sembawang road corridor.

During the construction of the station, the Outram Primary School had to be relocated for the construction of the station.

During the construction, a slip road from Outram Road to Eu Tong Sen Street had to be closed and sewer pipes had to be moved. The tunnel from Outram Park to Tiong Bahru was completed in September 1984.

Train services commenced on 12 December when the line extension to this station was officially completed. The station was part of a line service that ran continuously from Yishun station in the north to Lakeside station in the west. From 28 October 1989, it began to serve the EWL with the operational split of the MRT system.

North East line

In preliminary studies for the North East line (NEL) in 1986, it was planned for the line to terminate at this station rather than HarbourFront. In a later study in 1995, the plans for the NEL were extended to serve World Trade Centre. After plans for the new line were approved by the government in January 1996, it was announced by communications minister Mah Bow Tan in March 1996 that the station will interchange with NEL.

The East West line station upgrading was completed on 12 October 2002. Construction began in September 2000 for their lift access in the station for the disabled.

Thomson–East Coast line

On 29 August 2012, LTA announced Outram Park station would interchange with the proposed Thomson Line. At the same time, the Singapore Land Authority announced the acquisition of Pearls Centre, giving residents three years to vacate the premises, so as to facilitate tunneling works under the complex.

On 15 August 2014, LTA announced that the Thomson Line will be integrated into the Thomson–East Coast line (TEL). Outram Park will be constructed as part of Phase 3, consisting of 13 stations between Mount Pleasant and Gardens by the Bay. On 9 March 2022, Transport Minister S Iswaran announced in Parliament that Stage 3 (Caldecott to Gardens by the Bay via Napier), would open in the second half of 2022.

Contract T220 for the design and construction of Outram Park TEL Station and associated tunnels was awarded to Daelim Industrial Co. Ltd at a sum of S$301 million in May 2014. Construction started in 2014, with completion expected in June 2022.

As part of the construction works, the existing station complex was upgraded to improve capacity. A new entrance was constructed on the other side of Outram Road, providing access to the healthcare developments opposite the East West Line station. The existing, narrow linkway connecting the North East line and East West line was replaced with a new linkway on 29 May 2022, featuring improved directional signages and travelators. The former linkway will connect to the Thomson-East Coast Line platforms.

As announced during a visit by Transport Minister S. Iswaran at the Outram Park and  stations on 7 October 2022, the TEL station began operations on 13 November 2022.

Incidents
On 6 March 2008, the North East line sector of the station was the site of a rare police shooting incident, in which a 43-year old Lim Bock Song, who had earlier fatally stabbed odd-job worker Tan Ah Chang at a coffeeshop at Jalan Kukoh, was shot by a police officer after threatening the officer with the knife. Four platform screen doors in the centre in the direction of HarbourFront were affected due to the police cordon which lasted two hours and passengers had to use other doors to board and alight. However, train services were unaffected. A subsequent coroner's inquiry conducted for the shooting of Lim Bock Song ruled that the shooting was a case of justifiable homicide. The man was shot after charging at police officer Azli Othman with a knife. District Judge Yeo ruled the shooting was without any criminal intent.

Notes and references

Notes

References

Bibliography

External links

 SBS Transit's Outram Park MRT station official website
 
 Outram Park to Changi Airport MRT station route

Railway stations in Singapore opened in 1987
Bukit Merah
Outram, Singapore
Tanjong Pagar
Chinatown, Singapore
Mass Rapid Transit (Singapore) stations